Kayla de Waal (born 11 June 2000) is a South African field hockey player for the South African national team.

International career

Under–18
Retief Ochse and she is South Africa as Biathle is 2017 UIPM Biathle World Championships,  Relay Biathle Mix Youth A Under-19 Biathle to rank 4. She as biathle Under-19 to rank 6.

She made South Africa U–21 as the African Youth Games in 2018 and 2018 Summer Youth Olympics.

Under–21
Kayla made her debut for the South Africa U–21 in 2022 at the FIH Junior World Cup in Potchefstroom.

National team
Kayla participated at the  2022 Women's FIH Hockey World Cup

Following her successful debut in the indoor Test is South Africa  v. Switzerland.

Personal life
She attended Herschel Girls School, studied at the Stellenbosch University.

Awards

Western Province
 2022 - Senior Indoor IPT - Leading Goalscorer

References

External links

Kayla de Waal at the Princess Sportsgear

2000 births
Living people
South African female field hockey players
South African female modern pentathletes
Field hockey players at the 2018 Summer Youth Olympics
Field hockey players at the 2018 African Youth Games
Alumni of Herschel Girls' School
Field hockey players from Cape Town
21st-century South African women
2023 FIH Indoor Hockey World Cup players